Louis Remy de la Fosse ( 1659–1726) was a French architect during the Baroque period, who worked primarily in Germany.
Until 1705, he was draftsman in the studio of master builder  in Berlin. From 1706 to 1709, Fosse was  architect at the court of Elector Georg Ludwig in Hanover and later castle planner in Schlitz and Kassel. From 1711 to 1714 he was court architect in Hanover and afterwards senior engineer in the service of Ernest Louis, Landgrave of Hesse-Darmstadt.
In 1717, he build the Orangerie in Darmstadt. Fosse was commissioned to completely redesign the Residential Palace Darmstadt. Due to lack of funds, only the main front and one wing of the large complex were realized.

Works

References 

1659 births
1726 deaths
French Baroque architects
German Baroque architects
17th-century French architects
17th-century German architects
18th-century German architects